Clyburn is a surname. Notable people with the surname include:

Bill Clyburn, American politician from South Carolina
Danny Clyburn (1974-2012), American baseball player
Jennifer Clyburn Reed, American businessperson and schoolteacher
Jim Clyburn, American politician and the current Majority Whip in the U.S. House of Representatives
Kris Clyburn (born 1996), American basketball player for Maccabi Rishon LeZion of the Israeli Basketball Premier League
Mignon Clyburn, American bureaucrat
 Will Clyburn (born 1990), professional basketball player, 2016 top scorer in the Israel Basketball Premier League, 2019 EuroLeague Final Four MVP

See also
Clyburn Lake, Canadian lake
Clyburn railway station, Australian railroad station